The Port of Tianjin is divided into nine areas: the three core ("Tianjin Xingang") areas of Beijiang, Nanjiang, and Dongjiang around the Xingang fairway; the Haihe area along the river; the Beitang port area around the Beitangkou estuary; the Dagukou port area in the estuary of the Haihe River; and three areas under construction (Hanggu, Gaoshaling, Nangang).

Beijiang Port Area 

Beijiang Port Area includes the original areas of the Tanggu New Port, plus new facilities built on reclaimed land north of the Main Basin. It covers approximately 36.8 km2, has 18.9 km of coastline, and contains mostly container and general cargo terminals. It is also the main service and administration area of the port, including the Tianjin Port Container Logistics Center, the Tianjin Port Trade and Shipping Service Area, and the 7 km2 Tianjin Port Free Trade Zone

Nanjiang Port Area 

The Nanjiang Area() lies on an artificial island 16 km long (east to west) by 1.3–2 km wide (north to south), with an area of approximately 26 km2. Shoreline is 14.2 km long on the north side(opening to the Main Channel), and 12 km on the south side (opening to the Dagusha Channel). This port area contains the bulk cargo terminals, in particular the large oil, ore and coal terminals.

Dongjiang Port Area 

Dongjiang Port Area lies on an artificial peninsula 10 km long and 3 km wide to the northeast of the main basin, and has an approximate area of 33 km2. This is the newest part of Tianjin Xingang, and is still in development. It includes a new container terminal, a regional logistics center, and a 10 km2 bonded port area (the Dongjiang Bonded Port).

The Dongjiang Port Area is being developed into a comprehensive complex with three parallel zones: the terminal area; a logistic processing zone associated with the bonded port; and a comprehensive service zone, which will include office space, residential space, and shopping and leisure facilities. The leisure area will be centered on the cruiser terminal and yachting piers, and around an artificial beach (the Dongjiang Bay Scenic Area), built with sand imported from Fujian and including a variety of entertainment facilities (including a dragon boat pier).

Haihe Port Area 

The Haihe Port Area operates all river docks from the Xingang Shipping Lock up to the Haihe Second Tidal Barrier, a distance of 39.5 km. Once the core of the Tanggu port, the lower Haihe river area has seen diminishing number of wharves as riverfront real estate has been reassigned for development. In 2003, the Haihe Port Area had 7,100 m of quayside, 83 berths, 56 production berths dealing with all sorts of cargo including containers. The start of the work on the new Tanggu CBD, however, meant the demolition of most facilities in the Xiangguowan, Yujiapu and Lanjingdao peninsulas, including the large Third Stevedoring Company terminal in Yujiapu, which closed in 2009.

This wind-down of activity is still continuing, and on January 1, 2012, the Haihe will be downgraded from a category I waterway into a category IV, limited to vessels under 1,000 DWT and 10 m of air draft (which will permit the extensive bridge construction planned for the lower Haihe). This change will effectively close the river to seagoing vessels, and limit Haihe traffic to barges. Nevertheless, industrial expansion further up the river will lead to a recovery in the number of available berths. Current plans call for six different production areas, with an area of 9.7 km2 and a quayside length of 21 km.

Beitang Port Area 

The Beitang Port Area lies on both sides of the Beitangkou estuary. At present it is limited to several small barge wharves, but it is planned to expand as part of the development of the Binhai Tourism Area. There are two service wharves planned, 230 m and 150 m in length, plus a large environmental monitoring base, passenger terminal, construction materials wharves and yachting marina. The Beitang Fishing Harbor is directly north, inside the river estuary.

Dagukou Port Area 

The Dagukou Port Area lies on the southern side of the Haihe river mouth. It is composed of the wharves of the Tianjin Lingang Harbor Economic Zone, which is a large industrial area being constructed on reclaimed land. The Dagukou port area is expanding fast, and it is expected to reach a capacity of 100 Mt per year by 2015. Further up the Haihe estuary is the Donggu Fishing Port, which still moors 400 (mostly small) fishing boats.

Port fairway 

The Tianjin Xingang Fairway is divided into the Main Shipping Channel, the Chuanzhadong Channel, and the Northern Branch Channel. The Dagusha Channel and the Haihe river channel are separate fairways with slightly different regulations.

Shipping channels
 The Main shipping channel (新港主航道) is 39.5 km long. The channel extends from the gate line of the VTS control area (20 nautical miles (37 km) from the VTS control tower), up to the start of the Chuanzhadong Channel. Since November 2010, the Main Channel has been dredged to a depth of −19.5 m and a bottom width of 420 m, making it capable of handling two-way 250,000 DWT traffic, and to accept 300,000 DWT ships at high tide. There are two service channels (100 m wide and 9 m deep) at each side of the main channel, which allow ships under 10,000 DWT (i.e. service craft, barges and coastal ships) to transit without interference from the big ships. The breakwater mouth was expanded to 1,100 m wide in 2010. As of 2012, the Main Channel is being deepened to 22 m and widened to 765 m, which will allow two-way all-tide traffic of 300,000 DWT ships by 2013.
 The Chuanzhadong channel (船闸东航道), called "Chuanzha channel" in Admiralty charts, starts roughly at the level of the Second Pier and ends at the Xingang Shipping Lock, a total of around 4.5 km. Its depth varies between 10 m to 5 m as it approaches the shiplock.
 The Northern Harbor Branch Channel (北港支航道) extends from its bifurcation from the main channel up to the northern end of the basin, approximately 6.5 km. It has been dredged all the way to the end of the basin (where the Huicheng terminal lies) to a depth of 15 m and a width of between 190 m to 390 m. Its junction with the Main Channel was widened to 765 m in 2007 to facilitate traffic merging.

The Dagusha Channel (大沽沙航道) is wholly separate from the Main Channel. It is 27.5 km long from safe water (12 m isobath) to the mouth of the Haihe. It was upgraded in December 2010 to a depth of 12.3 m, 180 m wide, for a one-way traffic capacity of 50,000 DWT (100,000 DWT in high tide). Current dredging is expanding the Channel to 230 m bottom width and 14 m depth, which will allow all-tide traffic of 100,000 DWT vessels. The long-term plan is to dredge the Channel up to a two-way 200,000 DWT capability.

The Haihe River Channel varies in depth between 4 m to 8 m with a minimum bottom width of 50 m and a maximum of 120 m. It can handle vessels of up to 5,000 DWT in the section between the Xingang Shiplock and the Haimen Bridge, and up to 3,000 DWT and 31 m air draft from the Haimen Bridge to the Second Tidal Barrier. This capacity will be reduced to 1,000 DWT once the planned fixed bridges in the Haihe are built.

The Beitangkou Channel (北塘口航道) is at present a natural shallow-water buoyed channel capable of handling barges, fishing boats and service vessels of up to 1,000 gt. It is currently being dredged to 7.9 m depth, 190 m width.

The channels serving the other three port areas are being expanded and will become open as said areas become open. The Nangang Channel was activated in July 2011 on a trial basis. At present it extends 19 km and is dredged to a 5,000 DWT capacity (100 m wide, 6.5 m deep). According to plans, it will reach 100,000 DWT capacity by as early as 2015. The Gaoshaling Channel is currently being dredged to 12.5 m depth, 150 m width, for a planned capacity of 50,000 DWT in 2015. The Hangu Channel is being dredged for 16 km to a 7 m depth, 75 m width, for a capacity of 5,000 DWT 

A number of secondary channels have been set up and seamarked by the MSA and FLEC to divert small boat traffic away from the main fairways. The "Sand and Gravel Transport Boats Preferred Channel" (天津港砂石运输船舶推荐航路) runs to the south of the Main Channel and the Dagukou anchorages, and is designed to stop the dangerous flow of barges and construction vessels that used to cut across NE-SW, right through the flow of large ships. The Donggu Fishing Port Channel runs north of the Dagusha Channel, close to the Nanjiang island, and separates fishing boats from the deep water channel.

Harbor basins are breakwater-protected, and include the in-harbor Channels and the approaches to the wharves. The Main Harbor Basin extends 16.5 km from the Xingang Shipping Lock to breakwater mouth, and there are four secondary basins within the main basin, formed by the four jutting piers of the Beijiang port area. The North Harbor Basin is 8.5 km long by 1,100–900 m wide, and has two secondary basins (in construction). The Dagukou Harbor Basin is 14 km long, and tapers down from 1,500 to 900 m wide as it goes up the old Haihe mouth. It also has two secondary basins (in construction).

Anchorages 

Tianjin Port has six main anchorage areas and two temporary anchorages. All anchorages are designated for all functions—berth waiting, quarantine, inspection and pilotage—, and provide little shelter from weather or rough seas. Bottom hold is poor to very poor, anchored vessels are advised to keep five cables of clearance, as anchor dragging is common (up to 5–10 NM in a day in winter, due to drifting ice).

The Dagukou North, South and Chemical Bulk anchorages are situated on both sides of the main shipping channel, to the east of the Dagu Lighthouse. These anchorages cater for the majority of the traffic, and can get very crowded. Collisions have occurred with some frequency in the past. The two deep water anchorage sites are further out into the deeper parts of the Bohai Bay. One anchorage for very large Capesize vessels of more than 150,000 DWT is shared with Tangshan Caofeidian.

Two more anchorages (No5 and 6) serve the Dagukou area. Both are located on the south side of the Dagusha channel. No6 covers 40 km2, has depth of 10–13 m and anchors small and medium displacement vessels. No5 anchorage covers 20 km2 and has a depth of 16–18 m, anchoring larger vessels. No6 anchorage is operational but still little used, No5 was recently activated (2011) but it is still considered "temporary". The most recent temporary anchorage serves the newly opened (2011) Nangang area. Finally, there is a "Zhengjiatai Lay-By Berthing Area" (郑家台临时候泊区) on the Haihe, next to the Second Barrier for ships awaiting berths at the Zhengjiatai terminal.

Shiplocks and tidal barriers 

The Haihe river channel is separated from the sea channels by three structures: First, the Xingang Shiplock in the northern side of the estuary is the main shipping route into the Haihe area. It was started by the Japanese occupation forces in 1942, completed in 1943 and made operational by the Nationalist government after the war, in 1946. It has a width of 20.5 m, a length of 180 m and cill depth of 5 m. It allows passage to vessels up to 18.5 m wide, limited to 17.5 m at night and for ships carrying liquid bulk or otherwise dangerous cargoes. The Haihe Bridge is directly over the shiplock, with an air clearance of 39.5 m.

Second, the Haihe Tidal Barrier, built in 1958, and last refurbished in 1999, serves as a dam, flood control sluice and tide surge protection for the Haihe river mouth. It is an open sluice design, with 8 vertical-rising gates designed for an average flow of 1,200 m3/s flow when open, with a maximum flow of 1,689 m3/s recorded on 28 August 1963.

Third, the Tanggu Fishing Boat Lock is located at the western end of the channel between Donggu and Lanjingdao Island. Built in 1959, it is 150 m long, 14 m wide, 8 m ditch depth, with cill water depth of 2.5 m. It can handle ships of up to 200 gt. In 2011, the Fishing Boat Lock gates started to be rebuilt to allow for larger road traffic between Donggu and Lanjingdao.

The final hydraulic structure of the Tianjin Port is the Haihe Second Barrier at Dongnigucun, in the Jinnan district. The Second Barrier is also an open-type sluice barrier, with 8 vertical-rising gates allowing an average flow of 1200 m3/s. The Barrier, opened in July 1984, closes ship traffic upriver into Tianjin city proper, and its erection resulted in the abandonment of 29.3 km of navigable channel.

Port areas under development 

The last three areas (Gaoshaling, Nangang, Hangu) are under construction, and will be integrated into Port operations as they come online.

Hangu Port Area comprises the Tianjin Central Fishing Port (天津中心渔港), which is located at Caijiabao (蔡家堡) to the north of Beitang. The Central Fishing Port is a large (18 km2) mixed development that gathers tourist facilities, a yachting marina, a fishing port with 17 berths capable of handling ships up to 5,000 DWT for a throughput of 17 million tonnes, and cold-chain warehousing. It is expected to go into full operation in 2012–13.

Gaoshaling Port Area is located on reclaimed land to the south of the Lingang Industrial Area and north of the Duliujian (独流减) river. It includes the docks of the southern section of the Lingang Economic Area, and will have its own channel. Gaoshaling area will focus on heavy equipment handling and other heavy industrial cargo. The

Nangang Port Area is being built on the reclaimed land of the TEDA Nangang Industrial Zone (天津开发区南港工业区), south of the Duliujian river and north of the Ziya river. It will focus at first on petrochemical goods. The first trial wharf opened in 2011.

Geophysical setting

Geology 

The coastal area of Tianjin municipality prior to development was dominated by mudflats, salt marshes (and salterns), and coastal shallows. This littoral zone is wide and slopes gently: the 0 m isobath (the intertidal flats) extends to 3–8 km from shore at a slope of 0.71–1.28%, the −5 m isobath extends 14–18 km from shore, and the −10 m isobath reaches 22–36 km from shore. These features make deep water navigation dependent on extensive dredging, but it also means that land reclamation is a cost-effective option for construction. Tianjin Port is thus by necessity largely man-made through dredging and reclamation.

Soil geology: As it is largely built on man-made surfaces, Tianjin Port’s engineering geology is fairly regular:

 A layer of artificial fill from +4.6 m to +2.0 m of elevation. On older parts of the Port, this layer was placed by jetting dredged material, which made the dredged silty clay finer. More recent construction uses the vacuum preloading method, which results in better compacted surfaces.
 A layer of marine deposits of silt and silty clay interspersed with sand, of recent date (~800 years BP). It is around 15 m thick, highly waterlogged, and considered a risk to liquefy during an earthquake.
 A layer of alluvial deposit of the Holocene estuary delta. This is mostly cohesive soil (silty clay) and silty sand, horizontally stratified. At −21 m there is a dense layer of fine sand, which provides good support for piles and foundations. although in newer construction, piling usually extends to −36 m or beyond. Bedrock is not reached at engineering depths (shallowest seams are 180 m)

Seismological Conditions: The area of Tianjin is very seismically active. The 1976 Tangshan earthquake affected the harbor and caused serious damage to its installations. The Port's current design specifications are to resist earthquakes of intensity 7, to a basic design Peak ground acceleration of 0.15 g.

Meteorological conditions 

Climate: Tianjin Port is at the northern limit of the continental monsoon climate area. Specifically, it belongs to the temperate semi-humid continental climate type (Köppen Dwa), with a short rainy season in the summer, large seasonal differences in temperature, and large variation in weather year to year. The average relative humidity is 65%, with a maximum of 100% recorded in summer, and a minimum of 3% recorded in winter.

Maximum recorded annual rainfall was in 1964 (1,083.5 mm), and minimum recorded annual rainfall was in 1968 (278.4 mm). The maximum single day precipitation recorded occurred on 30 July 1975 (191.5 mm). The average number of thunderstorms is 27.5 per year, mostly breaking out in June and July. Due to its shallowness and narrowness, the Tianjin coast is prone to storm surges: since 1860 there has been 30 storm surges, around once every 4 years, most recently in 2003, 2009 and 2011. Of the nine serious surges in the last hundred years, five were caused by typhoons (the Bohai Bay is at the northernmost range of the Pacific typhoon corridor), and four by winter cyclones.

Winds: Average annual wind velocity is 4.43 m/s; Easterly winds have the fastest average velocity, averaging 6.51 m/s. Strongest (steady) wind recorded was a WNW blowing at 33 m/s, on 3 January 1986. Winds over category 7 are observed for 1–7% of the year. Predominant winds are:
 Spring: SW
 Summer: SE
 Autumn: SW
 Winter: NW

Fog: Fog or haze is present around one third of the year, particularly during winter. Of these hazy days, there is an average of 16.5 fog days per year with visibility of less than one kilometer (a visibility level that triggers severe restriction of traffic in the port). The foggiest year on record was 1972, with 26 days; foggiest month was January 1973 with 12 days. Like other regions in the North China Plain, Tianjin Port is prone to pollution haze. This haze can be a navigational problem when combined with foggy conditions.

Hydrology
The Bohai Bay is one of the three bays that compose the Bohai Sea. The Bay is a semi-enclosed, fairly shallow water basin, with average depth below 10 m. It has relatively poor water exchange into the Bohai Sea, and in turn the Bohai Sea exchanges poorly with the Yellow Sea (it can take 40 to 200 years for complete water turnaround), which means that both silt and pollution runoff accumulates in the Bay.

Tides: Tanggu has a mixed semidiurnal tide. The lunitidal interval is 45 min, the average duration of rise is 5 h 40 min, and the average duration of fall is 6 h 53 min. The daily inequality between low waters is particularly marked.
Average tide heights at the Tanggu Oceanic Station (塘沽海洋站) are:

 Mean Sea Level: 2.56 m
 Mean High Water (MHW): 3.74 m
 Mean Higher High Water (MHHW – Admiralty Datum): 3.7 m
 Mean Lower High Water (MLHW – Admiralty Datum): 3.6 m
 Mean Low Water (MLW): 1.34 m
 Mean Higher Low Water (MHLW – Admiralty Datum): 1.7 m
 Mean Lower Low Water (MLLW – Admiralty Datum): 0.7 m
 Mean Tidal Range: 2.47 m
 Mean Tidal Range Springs: 3.5 m (NGA approximation)
 Mean Tidal Range Neaps: 2 m (NGA approximation)
 Maximum High Tide Recorded: 5.83 m(September 1992)
 Minimum Low Tide Recorded: −1.08 m (18 December 1957)
 Maximum Tidal Range Recorded: 4.37 m (26 October 1980)

The design water levels for port facilities are:

 Design high water level: 4.30 m
 Design low water level: 0.50 m
 Extreme high water level: 5.88 m
 Extreme low water level: -1.29 m

Tidal currents: Flood tide at the Dagukou Anchorage flows northwest (average bearing 292°), at an average speed of 0.8 knots, and a maximum of 1.9 knots. Ebbing tide flows to the southeast (130° average bearing), at an average speed of 0.7 knots, and a maximum of 1 knot. Tide currents within breakwaters are parallel to the channel and have a maximum speed of 0.64 knots.

Waves: The western Bohai Bay is a relatively calm body of water. The frequency of waves below 1.0 m height is 87.6%, of waves of height above 1.0 m is 12.4%, waves above 2.0 m is 1.9% and waves above 3.0 m is 0.4%. The proportion of pure wind waves is 74.2%, of pure swell waves is 0.9%, and of mixed swell/wind is 24.9%. Predominant wave directions are NNE-E (9.68% frequency), ENE-E (9.53%) S (9.27%), SSE (8.91%) and SE (8.30%). Waves are strongest in spring and weakest in fall. Summers are very calm, unless typhoons wander off far enough north. Strongest average waves are ENE and NNW waves.

Icing: Ice cover in the Bohai Bay is highest in February. Shore icing extends an average of 500 m, with an average thickness of 10–25 cm, maximum of 40 cm. Drift ice extends 15–20 nm, roughly to the 10–15 m isobath. Average drift ice thickness is around 5 cm, maximum thickness is 20–25 cm. Ice flows are SE–NW, at an average speed of 30 cm/s, maximum of 100 cm/s.
Icing is a regular problem for the Haihe river port area, and requires continuous clearing. Icing is not normally a navigational hazard at the seaport, except on extremely severe winters like the 2009–2010 winter (the severest in over 30 years). Seasonal buoyage change is necessary.

Sedimentation: Silting was long considered an insurmountable obstacle to deep-water navigation at Tanggu. However, the extensive hydraulic work of the last decades, in particular the damming of the Haihe, has reduced silting to manageable levels, reducing average estuary water sediment from 0.75 kg/m3 to 0.1 kg/m3

Pollution: Severe eutrophication caused by polluted runoff has made red tides in the Bohai Bay common. Combined with overfishing, this has put pressure on once-abundant fish stocks. Biological pollution is also a problem, with illegal ballast water discharges creating a strong danger of invasive exotic species. Habitat destruction caused by reclamation has damaged coastal wetlands, intertidal flats and shallow water hatcheries essential for many fish and bird species.

Notes

References

External links 
 Tianjin Port Holdings Company Limited
 Tianjin Port Development Holdings Limited
 Map of the Port of Tianjin
 Live AIS Map of the Port of Tianjin

Port of Tianjin